Trachyrhamphus  is a genus of pipefishes native to the Indian and western Pacific Oceans.

Species
There are currently three recognized species in this genus:
 Trachyrhamphus bicoarctatus (Bleeker, 1857) (Double-ended pipefish)
 Trachyrhamphus longirostris Kaup, 1856 (Long-head pipefish, Straightstick pipefish)
 Trachyrhamphus serratus (Temminck & Schlegel, 1850)

References

External links

Syngnathidae
Marine fish genera
Taxa named by Johann Jakob Kaup